Class is a 2014 novel by author Francesco Pacifico. It is set in the New York City borough of Brooklyn in 2010 and concerns a group of Italian expatriates living in Williamsburg. The novel was originally written in Italian and translated into English by Pacifico and Mark Krotov.

References

2014 novels
Novels set in Brooklyn
Novels about immigration to the United States
Novels set in the 2010s
Fiction set in 2010
Italian-language books
Arnoldo Mondadori Editore books